The men's masters competition at the 2006 Asian Games in Doha was held on 9 and 10 December 2006 at Qatar Bowling Centre.

The Masters event comprises the top 16 bowlers (maximum two per country) from the all-events competition.

Schedule
All times are Arabia Standard Time (UTC+03:00)

Results 
Legend
DNF — Did not finish

Preliminary

Stepladder finals

References 

Results at ABF Website
Results

External links
Official Website

Men's masters